I'm Not Who You Think I Am is an American novel for young adults by Peg Kehret, published in 1999.

Plot
Thirteen-year-old Ginger becomes the target of a disturbed lady who believes that Ginger is her daughter. Ginger becomes distressed when the woman, named Joyce, starts stalking her insisting that Ginger is her daughter. Joyce uses the help of her brother-in-law while Ginger's parents are out of town to speak to Ginger and convince Ginger to go with Joyce.

Reception
Kirkus Reviews finds "While the story reads like a thriller, the character development and moral dilemmas add depth and substance."  while Publishers Weekly says "Thriller buffs may be disappointed by the thin characterizations and contrivances, but ...  most readers will want to stick around long enough to see how she escapes Joyce's clutches."

References

1999 American novels
Novels by Peg Kehret
American young adult novels
Dutton Children's Books books